Poisk may refer to:

Poisk (computer), a Ukrainian(USSR) IBM PC XT clone (see List of Soviet computer systems)
Poisk (ISS module), a component of the International Space Station
POISK Centre, an educational and research organization at Saint Petersburg State University